Annamalai Nadesu Sivasakthy Ananthan (born 29 July 1964) is a Sri Lankan Tamil politician and Member of Parliament.

Early life
Ananthan was born on 29 July 1964.

Career
Ananthan is a member of the Eelam People's Revolutionary Liberation Front (EPRLF). On 20 October 2001 the All Ceylon Tamil Congress, EPRLF, Tamil Eelam Liberation Organization and Tamil United Liberation Front formed the Tamil National Alliance (TNA). Ananthan contested the 2001 parliamentary election as one of the TNA's candidates in Vanni District. He was elected and entered Parliament. He was re-elected at the 2004, 2010 and 2015 parliamentary elections.

Electoral history

References

1964 births
Eelam People's Revolutionary Liberation Front politicians
Living people
Members of the 12th Parliament of Sri Lanka
Members of the 13th Parliament of Sri Lanka
Members of the 14th Parliament of Sri Lanka
Members of the 15th Parliament of Sri Lanka
People from Northern Province, Sri Lanka
Sri Lankan Hindus
Sri Lankan Tamil politicians
Sri Lankan Tamil rebels
Tamil National Alliance politicians